Cambodia national under-21 football team is the national under-21 football team representing Cambodia at the AFC U19 Championship, AFF U19 Championship, and Hassanal Bolkiah Trophy. It is administered by the Football Federation of Cambodia.

Competition Records

AFC Youth Championship

AFF U20 Youth Championship record

AFF U19 Youth Championship record

Hassanal Bolkiah Trophy record

Fixture and results

2019
2019 AFF U-18 Youth Championship

2020 AFC U-19 Championship qualification

2021
2020 AFC U-19 Championship

2022
2022 AFF U-19 Youth Championship (2–15 July) 

2023 AFC U-20 Asian Cup qualification

Current squad
The following players were called up for 2023 AFC U-20 Asian Cup qualification.

|-----
! colspan=9 style="background:#000080" align="left" |
|----- bgcolor="#DFEDFD"

|-----
! colspan=9 style="background:#000080" align="left" |

|----- bgcolor="#DFEDFD"
|-----
! colspan=9 style="background:#000080" align="left" |

|----- bgcolor="#DFEDFD"

Coaching staff

See also

Leagues
 Cambodian Premier League
 Cambodian League 2

Cups
 Hun Sen Cup
 CNCC League Cup
 Cambodian Super Cup

National teams
Men
 Cambodia national football team
 Cambodia national under-23 football team
 Cambodia national under-17 football team
Women
 Cambodia women's national football team
Futsal
 Cambodia national futsal team

Other
 Football in Cambodia
 Cambodian Football Federation

References

under